Sector is a name for an administrative division in some countries.

It is used for:
 Sectors of Bucharest
 Sectors of Guinea-Bissau
 Sectors of Rwanda
 Sectors of the Democratic Republic of the Congo

See also

Sector (disambiguation)

Types of administrative division